Partula may refer to:

Partula (gastropod), a genus of snails of the family Partulidae
Partula, a Roman goddess of childbirth; see List of Roman birth and childhood deities

pt:Partula